El-Sayyid el-Badawi Shehata (born 1950) is an Egyptian businessman and the President of Al-Wafd Party. He is the head of the Board of Directors of Al-Hayah Egyptian television network.

Early life
Badawi was born in 1950 and grew up in Tanta governorate. He graduated from the Faculty of Pharmacy of the University of Alexandria in 1973.

Career
Badawi started his political career in the 1980s and joined Wafd Party in 1980 where he was elected as secretary general of the party in 2000.

References 

1950 births
Living people
Egyptian businesspeople
Members of the Egyptian Constituent Assembly of 2012
Alexandria University alumni
People from Tanta